The cutthroat trout  is a fish species of the family Salmonidae native to cold-water tributaries of the Pacific Ocean, Rocky Mountains, and Great Basin in North America. As a member of the genus Oncorhynchus, it is one of the Pacific trout, a group that includes the widely distributed rainbow trout. Cutthroat trout are popular gamefish, especially among anglers who enjoy fly fishing. The common name "cutthroat" refers to the distinctive red coloration on the underside of the lower jaw. The specific name clarkii was given to honor explorer William Clark, coleader of the Lewis and Clark Expedition.

Cutthroat trout usually inhabit and spawn in small to moderately large, clear, well-oxygenated, shallow rivers with gravel bottoms. They reproduce in clear, cold, moderately deep lakes. They are native to the alluvial or freestone streams that are typical tributaries of the rivers of the Pacific Basin, Great Basin and Rocky Mountains. Cutthroat trout spawn in the spring and may inadvertently but naturally hybridize with rainbow trout, producing fertile cutbows. Some populations of the coastal cutthroat trout  are semi-anadromous.

Several subspecies of cutthroat trout are currently listed as threatened in their native ranges due to habitat loss and the introduction of non-native species. Cutthroat trout are raised in hatcheries to restore populations in their native range, as well as stock non-native lake environments to support angling. The cutthroat trout type species and several subspecies are the official state fish of seven western U.S. states.

Taxonomy

Cutthroat trout were the first New World trout encountered by Europeans when in 1541, Spanish explorer Francisco de Coronado recorded seeing trout in the Pecos River near Santa Fe, New Mexico. These were most likely Rio Grande cutthroat trout . The species was first described in the journals of explorer William Clark from specimens obtained during the Lewis and Clark Expedition from the Missouri River near Great Falls, Montana, and these were most likely the westslope cutthroat trout . As one of Lewis and Clark's many missions was to describe the flora and fauna encountered during their expedition, cutthroat trout were given the name  in honor of William Clark. This type specimen was most likely the coastal cutthroat trout subspecies . Until the 1960s, populations of westslope cutthroat trout and Yellowstone cutthroat trout were lumped into one subspecies; Salmo clarkii lewisii. Biologists later split the group into two subspecies, christening the name westslope cutthroat trout with the lewisii name which honors explorer Meriwether Lewis and renaming the Yellowstone cutthroat trout Salmo bouvierii, the first name given to the Yellowstone cutthroat trout by David Starr Jordan in 1883 honoring a U.S. Army Captain Bouvier.

In 1989, morphological and genetic studies indicated trout of the Pacific Basin were genetically closer to Pacific salmon (Oncorhynchus species) than to the Salmos–brown trout  or Atlantic salmon  of the Atlantic Basin. Thus, in 1989, taxonomic authorities moved the rainbow, cutthroat and other Pacific Basin trout into the genus Oncorhynchus.

Subspecies
Behnke in his salmon and trout handbook of 2002 recognized 14 subspecies of cutthroat trout that are each native to a separate geographic area. Not all of them were scientifically described, and different views on the taxonomic identities have been presented in some cases. It has been suggested that the cutthroat trout evolved from a common Oncorhynchus ancestor that migrated along the Pacific Coast and into the mountain west primarily via the Columbia and Snake River basins 3-5 million years ago, in the late Pliocene or early Pleistocene epochs. These epochs had repeated glacial and interglacial periods that would have caused repeated fracturing and isolation of cutthroat trout populations, eventually resulting in the different subspecies found today. The 14 subspecies are found in four evolutionary groups—Coastal, Westslope, Yellowstone and Lahontan.

Description

Throughout their native and introduced ranges, cutthroat trout vary widely in size, coloration and habitat selection. Their coloration can range from golden to gray to green on the back. Cutthroat trout can generally be distinguished from rainbow trout by the presence of basibranchial teeth at the base of tongue and a maxillary that extends beyond the posterior edge of the eye. Depending on subspecies, strain and habitat, most have distinctive red, pink, or orange linear marks along the underside of their mandibles in the lower folds of the gill plates. These markings are responsible for the common name "cutthroat", first given to the trout by outdoor writer Charles Hallock in an 1884 article in The American Angler. These markings are not unique to the species. Some coastal rainbow trout  and Columbia River redband trout  populations also display reddish or pink throat markings.

Sea-run forms of coastal cutthroat trout average . The length and weights of mature inland forms vary widely depending on their particular environment and availability of food. The largest cutthroat trout subspecies is the Lahontan cutthroat trout .

Lifecycle
Cutthroat trout usually inhabit and spawn in small to moderately large, clear, well-oxygenated, shallow rivers with gravel bottoms. They are native to the alluvial or freestone streams typical of tributaries of the Pacific Basin, Great Basin and Rocky Mountains. They spawn in the spring, as early as February in coastal rivers and as late as July in high mountain lakes and streams. Spawning begins when water temperatures reach . Cutthroat trout construct a redd in the stream gravel to lay eggs. The female selects the site for and excavates the redd. Females, depending on size, lay between 200 and 4,400 eggs. Eggs are fertilized with milt (sperm) by an attending male. Eggs hatch into alevins or sac fry in about a month and spend two weeks in the gravel while they absorb their yolk sack before emerging. After emergence, fry begin feeding on zooplankton. Juvenile cutthroat trout typically mature in three to five years. Lake-resident cutthroat trout are usually found in moderately deep, cool lakes with adequate shallows and vegetation for good food production. Lake populations generally require access to gravel-bottomed streams to be self-sustaining, but occasionally spawn on shallow gravel beds with good water circulation.

Cutthroat trout naturally interbreed with the closely related rainbow trout, producing fertile hybrids commonly called "cutbows". This hybrid generally bears similar coloration and overall appearance to the cutthroat trout, usually retaining the characteristic orange-red slash. Cutbow hybrids often pose a taxonomic difficulty when trying to distinguish any given specimen as a rainbow or cutthroat trout.

Ecology

Range

Cutthroat trout are native to western North America and have evolved through geographic isolation into 14 subspecies, each native to a different major drainage basin. Native cutthroat trout species are found along the Pacific Northwest coast from Alaska through British Columbia into northern California, in the Cascade Range, the Great Basin and throughout the Rocky Mountains including southern Alberta. Some coastal populations of the coastal cutthroat trout  are semianadromous, spending a few months in marine environments to feed as adults and returning to fresh water from fall through early spring to feed on insects and spawn. Cutthroat trout have the second-largest historic native range of North American trout; the lake trout  having the largest. Ranges of some subspecies, particularly the westslope cutthroat trout , have been reduced to less than 10 percent of their historic range due to habitat loss and introduction of non-native species.

Scientists believe that the climatic and geologic conditions 3-5 million years ago allowed cutthroat trout from the Snake River to migrate over the divide into the Yellowstone plateau via Two Ocean Pass. There is also evidence that Yellowstone Lake once drained south into the Snake River drainage. Evidence suggests that the westslope cutthroat trout was able to establish populations east of the divide via Summit Lake at Marias Pass which at one time connected the Flathead River drainage with the upper Missouri River drainage. Scientists speculate that there are several mountain passes associated with the headwaters of the Colorado River drainage and Arkansas/Platte River drainages that would have allowed migration of cutthroat trout east of the divide.

Cutthroat trout have been introduced into non-native waters outside their historic native range, but not to the extent of the rainbow trout . Within the native range of the Yellowstone cutthroat trout, U.S. Fisheries Bureau and National Park Service authorities introduced Yellowstone cutthroat trout into many fishless lakes in Yellowstone National Park. Cutthroat trout were introduced into Lake Michigan tributaries in the 1890s and sporadically in the early 20th century, but never established wild populations. A population of Yellowstone cutthroat trout purportedly has been established in Lake Huron. Although cutthroat trout are not native to Arizona, they are routinely introduced by the Arizona Game and Fish Department into high mountain lakes in the White Mountains in the northeastern region of that state.

Habitat

Cutthroat trout require cold, clear, well-oxygenated, shallow rivers with gravel bottoms or cold, moderately deep lakes. Healthy stream-side vegetation that reduces siltation is typical of healthy cutthroat trout habitat and beaver ponds may provide refuge during periods of drought and over winter. Most populations stay in fresh water throughout their lives and are known as nonmigratory, stream-resident or riverine populations. The coastal cutthroat trout  is the only cutthroat trout subspecies to coevolve through its entire range with the coastal rainbow trout (O. m. irideus). Portions of the westslope cutthroat trout's  range overlap with the Columbia River redband trout , but the majority of its native range is in headwater tributary streams above major waterfalls and other barriers to upstream migration. At least three subspecies are confined to isolated basins in the Great Basin and can tolerate saline or alkaline water.

Cutthroat trout are opportunistic feeders. Stream-resident cutthroat trout primarily feed on larval, pupal and adult forms of aquatic insects (typically caddisflies, stoneflies, mayflies and aquatic dipterans), and adult forms of terrestrial insects (typically ants, beetles, grasshoppers and crickets) that fall into the water, fish eggs, small fish, along with crayfish, shrimp and other crustaceans. As they grow the proportion of fish consumed increases in most populations. In saltwater estuaries and along beaches, Coastal cutthroat trout feed on small fish such as sculpins, sand lance, salmon fry and herring. They also consume shrimp, small squid and krill. In fresh water, they consume the same diet as stream resident trout—aquatic insects and crustaceans, amphibians, earthworms, small fish and fish eggs. Within the range of the bull trout  the cutthroat trout is a forage fish for the piscivorous bull trout.

Artificial propagation

Various subspecies of cutthroat trout are raised in commercial, state and federal hatcheries for introduction into suitable native and non-native riverine and lacustrine environments. In the early 20th century, several hatcheries were established in Yellowstone National Park by the U.S. Bureau of Fisheries. These hatcheries not only produced stocks of the Yellowstone cutthroat trout  for the park, but also took advantage of the great spawning stock of cutthroat trout to supply eggs to hatcheries around the U.S. Between the years 1901 and 1953 a total of 818 million trout eggs were exported from the park to hatcheries throughout the U.S. The Lahontan National Fish Hatchery operated by the U.S. Fish and Wildlife Service exists to restore populations of the Lahontan cutthroat trout  in Pyramid, Walker, Fallen Leaf, June, Marlette, and Gull Lakes and the Truckee River in California and Nevada. The hatchery produces about 300,000–400,000 Lahontan cutthroat trout fry annually. The Jackson National Fish Hatchery produces around 400,000 Snake River fine-spotted cutthroat trout  annually to support fisheries in Idaho and Wyoming. The Leadville National Fish Hatchery produces 125,000–200,000 Snake River fine-spotted, greenback cutthroat and rainbow trout annually to support fishing in the Fryingpan and Arkansas River drainages and other Colorado waters. The Bozeman Fish Technology Center, formerly a cutthroat trout fish hatchery in Bozeman, Montana, plays a major role in the restoration of the greenback  and westslope cutthroat trout  subspecies.

Population threats

The historic native range of cutthroat trout has been reduced by overfishing, urbanization and habitat loss due to mining, livestock grazing and logging. Population densities have been reduced and in some cases populations have disappeared though competition with non-native brook, brown, lake and rainbow trout, kokanee salmon, lake whitefish and mysis shrimp which were introduced in the late 19th and early 20th centuries. Scientists believe the westslope cutthroat trout will eventually be extirpated from the large lakes in Western Montana due to the trophic cascades resulting from lake trout and mysis shrimp introductions. The most serious current threats to several subspecies are interspecific breeding with introduced rainbow trout, creating hybrid cutbows, and intraspecific breeding with other introduced cutthroat trout subspecies. In the Greater Yellowstone Ecosystem, the presence of lake trout  in Yellowstone Lake in Yellowstone National Park has caused a serious decline in Yellowstone cutthroat trout . Outbreaks of whirling disease in major spawning tributaries within the native ranges have also caused declines. Most subspecies of cutthroat trout are highly susceptible to whirling disease, although the Snake River fine-spotted cutthroat trout  appears to be resistant to the parasite.

Interspecific and intraspecific breeding
The most serious impact on the genetic purity of most cutthroat trout subspecies results from interspecific and intraspecific breeding resulting in hybrids that carry the genes of both parents. In inland populations, the introduction of rainbow trout from hatchery stocks have resulted in cutbow hybrids that continue to diminish the genetic purity of many cutthroat trout subspecies. The introduction of hatchery-raised Yellowstone cutthroat trout into native ranges of other cutthroat trout subspecies, particularly the westslope cutthroat trout, has resulted in intraspecific breeding and diminished genetic purity of the westslope subspecies. As such, populations of genetically pure westslope cutthroat trout are very rare and localized in streams above barriers to upstream migrations by introduced species. Fisheries biologist Robert J. Behnke attributes the extinction of the yellowfin cutthroat trout  and Alvord cutthroat trout  subspecies to the introduction of non-native rainbow trout.

Decline of the Yellowstone subspecies

The population at the core of the Yellowstone cutthroat trout's native range, in Yellowstone Lake, declined significantly in the 1960s due to overharvest of mature cutthroat trout by anglers, as well as overharvesting of eggs by hatcheries in the early 20th century. Managers implemented catch and release, which required anglers to return their catches to the lake, and they terminated hatchery operations in the park, which allowed the cutthroat trout to recover. Then, in 1994, park officials discovered lake trout  in Yellowstone Lake. Although lake trout were established in Shoshone, Lewis and Heart Lakes in the Snake River drainage from U.S. government stocking operations in 1890, they were never officially introduced into the Yellowstone River drainage and their presence there is probably the result of accidental or illegal introductions. By 2000, the cutthroat trout population had declined to less than 10 percent of its early 20th century abundance. However, aggressive lake trout eradication programs have killed over 1 million lake trout since 1996, and the hope is that this will lead to a restoration of cutthroat numbers. Cutthroat trout co-exist with lake trout in Heart Lake, an isolated back-country lake at the head of the Heart River that gets little angling pressure.

Angling

Cutthroat trout are prized as a gamefish, particularly by fly anglers. They are regulated as a gamefish in every state and province they occur in. From the Yellowstone cutthroat trout fishery in Yellowstone National Park, the unique Lahontan cutthroat trout fishery in Pyramid Lake in Nevada, and the small stream fisheries of the westslope cutthroat trout to saltwater angling for sea-run cutthroat trout on the Pacific coast, cutthroat trout are a popular quarry for trout anglers throughout their ranges. The all-tackle world record is  caught in Pyramid Lake in December 1925. Their propensity to feed on aquatic and terrestrial insects make them an ideal quarry for the fly angler.

Sea-run fishing along the Pacific Coast
From Alaska to Northern California, coastal cutthroat trout in sea-run, resident stream and lacustrine forms are sought by anglers. Puget Sound in Washington is a stronghold of sea-run cutthroat trout fishing with its many tributaries and protected saltwater inlets and beaches. Fly anglers search for sea-run cutthroat trout along beaches, river mouths and estuaries year round. In the lower reaches of larger rivers, anglers in drift boats float the rivers searching for trout along the wooded shorelines. In addition to a cutthroat trout sport fishery managed by the Alaska Department of Fish and Game, the Federal Subsistence Management Program manages coastal cutthroat trout subsistence fisheries in Southeast Alaska.

Yellowstone fishery

Yellowstone National Park was established in 1872. By the 1890s, the Yellowstone cutthroat trout fishery in the Yellowstone River and Yellowstone Lake were well known and being promoted in national guidebooks.

In 1902, anticipating the completion of the east entrance road from Cody, Wyoming, Captain Hiram M. Chittenden supervised the construction of the first "Fishing Bridge" across the outlet of Yellowstone Lake. Fishing Bridge was rebuilt in 1919, and reconstructed in
1937, primarily to accommodate vehicle traffic. Between 1916 and 1931, a large development of campgrounds, cabins, stores and service facilities were built just east of the bridge to support anglers. This area is now known as the Fishing Bridge Historic District. The 1937 bridge boasted pedestrian walkways on either side of the roadway to give more room to anglers. Angling in the river, at Fishing Bridge and in the lake, boomed during the 1950s and 1960s and over harvest caused a significant decline in the fishery. Consequently, in 1973, fishing was no longer permitted from Fishing Bridge.

Pyramid Lake Lahontan subspecies fishery

The Pyramid Lake strain of the Lahontan cutthroat trout, source of the  world record and native to Pyramid Lake, Lake Tahoe and the Truckee River, was brought to near-extinction in the two decades between the 1920s-40s from overharvest, introduced species and loss of spawning habitat. In the 1970s, Pyramid Lake was stocked with Lahontan cutthroat trout strains still surviving in some nearby lakes, but they were not the large Pyramid Lake strain. Although the Pyramid Lake Paiute Tribe had been successful in re-establishing a cutthroat trout fishery on the reservation in Pyramid Lake, the cutthroat trout were not the large fish of the late 19th and early 20th century. In the late 1970, biologists discovered a surviving population of a pure Pyramid Lake strain in a small headwaters stream on the Nevada-Utah border that had at some point around 1900 been introduced into the stream. In 1995, the U.S. Fish and Wildlife Service began rearing these fish in the Lahontan National Fish Hatchery in Gardnerville, Nevada. In 2006, the Pyramid Lake strain of Lahontan cutthroat trout were reintroduced into the lake. Considered a "world-class" fishery, anglers routinely catch cutthroat trout exceeding .

As a symbol
The cutthroat trout is the state fish of Idaho, Montana and Wyoming, while particular subspecies of cutthroat are the state fish of Colorado, Nevada, New Mexico and Utah.
 Idaho Montana and Wyoming–Cutthroat trout 
 Colorado–Greenback cutthroat trout 
 Nevada–Lahontan cutthroat trout 
 New Mexico–Rio Grande cutthroat trout 
 Utah–Bonneville cutthroat trout

References

Further reading

External links

 
 
 Dr. Dave Neely podcast (includes discussion of cutthroat trout diversity)

Oncorhynchus
Cold water fish
Fish of the Pacific Ocean
Fish of Canada
Fish of the Western United States
Freshwater fish of North America
Freshwater fish of the United States
Fauna of the Northwestern United States
Fauna of the Southwestern United States
Fauna of California
Fauna of the Rocky Mountains
Fauna of the Sierra Nevada (United States)
Fish described in 1836
Symbols of Wyoming